Matthew Jarrid Murphy (born February 23, 1980) is a former American football player. He was selected in the seventh round of the 2002 NFL Draft by the Detroit Lions. He is currently a free agent.

Early life
Murphy was born to Michael and Dawn Murphy on 23 February 1980 in New Haven, Michigan. His uncle, Dwight Lee had played football in college at Michigan State where he had earned an All-American honorable mention.

He attended New Haven High School where he played six positions on the football team: defensive end, defensive tackle, fullback, linebacker, tight end, and wide receiver. During his senior year in 1996, Murphy compiled 80 tackles on defense and the Detroit Free Press named him an All-Met player.

College career
Murphy attended the University of Maryland, where he played as a tight end for the Terrapins. He was the first player to commit to the Maryland's then new head coach Ron Vanderlinden.

He sat out the 1997 season as a redshirt (college sports) before acting as the second-string tight end behind Eric James. That season, Murphy saw action in six games but recorded no receptions.

In 1999, Murphy was moved from tight end to defensive end. He saw action against Western Carolina Catamounts, West Virginia, and North Carolina, recording a tackle in each of the latter two games.

In 2000, he saw action in all eleven of the Terps' games, including a start as a defensive end against Virginia. He returned to the tight end role later in the season. Murphy recorded two tackles and no receptions. Murphy missed 2001 spring practice due to shoulder surgery.

In 2001, Murphy played in eleven games making twelve receptions for 137 yards, with a long of 34 yards. That season was Maryland's best in over a decade, with the team finishing with a 10–2 record, securing the Atlantic Coast Conference championship, and a Bowl Championship Series berth against fifth-ranked Florida.

Professional career
Murphy was selected in the seventh round of the 2002 NFL Draft by the Detroit Lions (253rd overall). That season, he saw action in one game against the Minnesota Vikings, where he made one reception for a gain of eight yards. On 2 September 2003, Murphy was released and then the following day re-signed to the Lions practice squad.

On 10 December 2003, he was signed by the Houston Texans. He remained with the Texans for three years, playing one, eleven, and nine games in the 2003, 2004, and 2005 seasons, but did not compile any further statistics until 2005. Then, Murphy made two receptions for 26 yards, one for 14 and one for 12 yards.

Houston then released Murphy and he signed with the Seattle Seahawks in the 2006 off-season, but was released on 2 September 2006. On 22 November 2006, Murphy was picked up by the Buffalo Bills. He played two games each for Buffalo in the 2006 and 2007 seasons, but compiled no statistics. Prior to the 2008 season, Murphy injured his shoulder during practice with a partial rotator cuff tear.

He was subsequently released from the Buffalo Bills, before being signed and then waived by the Denver Broncos.

References

1980 births
Living people
People from Macomb County, Michigan
Sportspeople from Metro Detroit
Players of American football from Michigan
Maryland Terrapins football players
Buffalo Bills players
Houston Texans players
Detroit Lions players